Gary Charles di Silvestri (born February 3, 1967 in Staten Island, New York, United States) cross-country skier who unsuccessfully competed for Dominica at the 2014 Winter Olympics in the 15 kilometre classical race.

Gary di Silvestri is a graduate of Monsignor Farrell High School in Staten Island, New York, where he was a member of the football, wrestling and track & field teams. He has an undergraduate degree from Georgetown University and a Master of Business Administration from Columbia University. In 1997, di Silvestri founded Deutsche Suisse Asset Management.  The Di Silvestris were accused in 2014 of evading paying taxes on the sale of their Turks and Caicos mansion in 2006, but were never indicted.

Olympics 
With sights set on competing at the 2014 Olympics in Sochi, di Silvestri raced in five Olympic qualifiers leading up to the games. He and his wife Angelica di Silvestri earned points by competing in qualifying races in lower level tournaments in New Zealand and North America.  Prior to the start of the games, Silvestri fell ill by contracting acute gastroenteritis, and was unable to finish the 15 km race. He was one of four competitors to not finish his 15km event (there was also one non-starter).

See also
Dominica at the 2014 Winter Olympics

References

1967 births
Living people
American male cross-country skiers
Columbia Business School alumni
Credit Suisse First Boston
Cross-country skiers at the 2014 Winter Olympics
Dominica male cross-country skiers
Dominica people of Italian descent
Georgetown University alumni
Olympic cross-country skiers of Dominica
Morgan Stanley employees
People from Washington, D.C.
Sportspeople from Staten Island
Dominica people of American descent